Grande Reportagem was a Portuguese language news magazine published in Lisbon, Portugal, between 1984 and 2005 with some interruptions.

History and profile
Grande Reportagem was first published as a weekly on 7 December 1984. The founding company was Reporpress and the magazine was edited by José Manuel Barata-Feyo. The headquarters of the weekly was in Lisbon. On 15 June 1985 the magazine folded. 

The magazine was restarted by Publications Don Quixote in December 1989. José Manuel Barata-Feyo again edited the magazine. At the early 1990s Miguel Sousa Tavares became its editor. From October 1991 the magazine began to be published on a monthly basis. In 2000 Francisco José Viegas was appointed editor of the monthly.

On 29 November 2003 Grande Reportagem changed its frequency to weekly and became a supplement of the dailies Diário de Notícias and Jornal de Notícias. During this period the magazine was part of Controlinveste. In December 2005 the magazine ceased publication.

Circulation
The circulation of Grande Reportagem was 26,760 copies in 1999 and 21,006 copies in 2000. It dropped to 19,985 copies in 2001.

See also
 List of magazines in Portugal

References

1984 establishments in Portugal
2005 disestablishments in Portugal
Defunct magazines published in Portugal
Magazines established in 1984
Magazines disestablished in 2005
Magazines published in Lisbon
Newspaper supplements
Portuguese-language magazines
Monthly magazines published in Portugal
News magazines published in Portugal
Weekly magazines published in Portugal